This is a list of notable volcanic eruptions in the 16th to 20th centuries with a Volcanic explosivity index (VEI) of 4 or higher, and smaller eruptions that resulted in significant damage or fatalities. Note that there may be uncertainties to dates with historical eruptions, and there are likely to be many large eruptions that have not been identified.

See also
List of volcanic eruptions in the 21st century
List of natural disasters by death toll
List of volcanic eruptions by death toll
Lists of volcanoes

References

External links
 VEI glossary entry from a USGS website
 How to measure the size of a volcanic eruption, from The Guardian
 The size and frequency of the largest explosive eruptions on Earth, a 2004 article from the Bulletin of Volcanology
 List of Large Holocene Eruptions (VEI > 4) from the Smithsonian Global Volcanism Program
 VEI (Volcanic Explosivity Index) from the Global Volcanism Program of the Smithsonian National Museum of Natural History

Volcanic Eruptions Of The 20th Century
Volcanic eruptions
1500–1999